Pauline Christianity or Pauline theology (also Paulism or Paulanity), otherwise referred to as Gentile Christianity, is the theology and form of Christianity which developed from the beliefs and doctrines espoused by the Hellenistic-Jewish Apostle Paul through his writings and those New Testament writings traditionally attributed to him. Paul's beliefs were rooted in the earliest Jewish Christianity, but deviated from this Jewish Christianity in their emphasis on inclusion of the Gentiles into God's New Covenant, and his rejection of circumcision as an unnecessary token of upholding the Mosaic Law.

Proto-orthodox Christianity, which is rooted in the first centuries of the history of Christianity, relies heavily on Pauline theology and beliefs, and considers them to be amplifications and explanations of the teachings of Jesus. Since the 18th century, a number of scholars have proposed that Paul's writings contain teachings that are different from the original teachings of Jesus and those of the earliest Jewish Christians, as documented in the canonical gospels, early Acts, and the rest of the New Testament, such as the Epistle of James.

Definition and etymology

Definition
Pauline Christianity or Pauline theology, also called "Paulism" or "Paulanity", is the theology and  Christianity which developed from the beliefs and doctrines espoused by Paul the Apostle through his writings. Paul's beliefs were strongly rooted in the earliest Jewish Christianity, but deviated from this Jewish Christianity in their emphasis on inclusion of the Gentiles into God's New Covenant, and his rejection of circumcision as an unnecessary token of upholding the Law.

Etymology
According to Hans Lietzmann, the term "Pauline Christianity" first came into use in the 20th century among scholars who proposed different strands of thought within Early Christianity, wherein Paul was a powerful influence.

Marxist writer Antonio Gramsci (1891–1937), who stressed the similarities between Primitive Christianity and Marxism, used the phrase 'Christo-Paulinism' not only to indicate Paul's greater importance, but also to distinguish between theological and ideological beliefs and the organization of the institutional Church.

The expression is also used by modern Christian scholars, such as John Ziesler and Christopher Mount, whose interest is in the recovery of Christian origins, and the importance of Paul for paleo-orthodoxy, Christian reconstructionism and restorationism.

Paul and the inclusion of Gentiles

The first Christians were Jews. According to Paul and the author of the Acts of the Apostles, he initially persecuted those early Christians, but then converted, and, years later, was called to proselytise among Gentiles.

Inclusion of Gentiles
An early creed about Jesus' death and resurrection which Paul probably used was 1 Corinthians 15, verses 3–5 (plus possible additional verses). Probably originating from the Jerusalem apostolic community, the antiquity of the creed has been noted by many biblical scholars:

There has been widespread acknowledgement of the view of W. D. Davies that the essential Jewishness of Paul's Christian perspective has been underplayed. In Davies' view, Paul replaced the Torah, the Jewish law or Law of Moses, with Christ..

In the view of Daniel Boyarin, Paula Fredriksen and other notable NT scholars cited by them, writing with lived experience of the Jewish context, Paul did not replace Torah or Halakha with Christ for Jewish believers, but simply taught gentiles that observing the noachide covenant as righteous among the nations was sufficient (along with faith in Christ), to merit a share in the world to come.  This was a view shared by the Pharisees and taught in the Talmud and Maimonides (with the except of the element of faith in Christ), but denied by (mostly gentile born) Judaizers who taught conversion to Judaism as a requisite for salvation.  For example, his epistle to the Romans 13 teaches the obligations of a righteous gentile under the Noachide covenant, with Romans 14-15 expansive commentary on dietary ethics.

According to Christopher Rowland, "the problems with which he wrestles in his letters were probably typical of many which were facing the Christian sect during this period".

According to Krister Stendahl, the main concern of Paul's writings on Jesus' role, and salvation by faith, is the problem of the inclusion of gentile (Greek) Torah observers into God's covenant. The inclusion of Gentiles into early Christianity posed a problem for the Jewish identity of the early Christians. Many of the Jewish Christians were fully faithful religious Jews, only differing in their acceptance of Jesus as the Messiah. Observance of the Jewish commands, including circumcision, was regarded as a token of the membership of this covenant, and the early Jewish Christians insisted on keeping those observances. The new converts did not follow all "Jewish Law" and refused to be circumcised, as circumcision was considered repulsive during the period of Hellenization of the Eastern Mediterranean.

Paul objected strongly to the insistence on keeping all of the Jewish commandments, considering it a great threat to his doctrine of salvation through faith in Jesus. For Paul, Jesus' death and resurrection solved this problem of the exclusion of the gentiles from God's covenant. 'Dying for our sins' refers to the problem of gentile Torah-observers, who, despite their faithfulness, cannot fully observe commandments, including circumcision, and are therefore 'sinners', excluded from God's covenant. Jesus' death and resurrection solved this problem of the exclusion of the gentiles from God's covenant, as indicated by Rom 3:21-26.

Paul insists that salvation is received by the grace of God; according to Sanders, this insistence is in line with Judaism of ca. 200 BCE until 200 CE, which saw God's covenant with Israel as an act of grace of God. Observance of the Law is needed to maintain the covenant, but the covenant is not earned by observing the Law, but by the grace of God.

Split with Jewish Christianity

There was a slowly growing chasm between Christians and Jews, rather than a sudden split. Even though it is commonly thought that Paul established a Gentile church, it took centuries for a complete break to manifest.

Irenaeus, bishop of Lyon, wrote in the latter half of the 2nd century that the Ebionites rejected Paul as an apostate from the law, using only a version of the Gospel according to St. Matthew, known as the Gospel of the Ebionites.

Influence
Paul had a strong influence on early Christianity, transmuting Jesus the Jewish messiah into the universal savior. This thesis is founded on differences between the views of Paul and the earliest Jewish Christianity, and also between the picture of Paul in the Acts of the Apostles and his own writings. In this view, Paul is to be taken as pro-Hellenization or Romanization.

Scholarly views

There are considerable differences of scholarly opinion concerning how far Paul did in fact influence Christian doctrine.

According to the 19th-century German theologian Ferdinand Christian Baur, founder of the Tübingen school whose view was widely influential, Paul was utterly opposed to the disciples, based upon his view that Acts was late and unreliable and who contended that Catholic Christianity was a synthesis of the views of Paul and the Judaizing church in Jerusalem. Since Adolf von Harnack, the Tübingen position has been generally abandoned. 
 
Ultradispensationalists such as E. W. Bullinger viewed the distinction abhorred by the Ebionites as positive and essential doctrine.

Pauline Christianity was essentially based on Rome and made use of the administrative skills which Rome had honed. Its system of organization with a single bishop for each town was, in Bart Ehrman's view, the means by which it obtained its hegemony.

Michael Goulder wrote widely on a theory of Christian origins that sees a fundamental opposition between Paul the Apostle on one side and the Jerusalem Christians Peter and James, Jesus' brother, on the other. This has been seen as reviving a hypothesis proposed by 19th century Hegelian philosopher and theologian Ferdinand Christian Baur of the Tübingen school.

Distortion
Some literary critics of Christianity argue that Paul distorted the original and true faith, or claim that Christianity is largely his invention. The former include such secular commentators as the philosophers Friedrich Nietzsche and Bertrand Russell. Nietzsche's criticisms are based upon his moral objections to Paul's thought. Other writers, such as Slavoj Žižek and Alain Badiou, also agree with this interpretation, but hold much more positive opinions about Paul's theological influence.

Christian anarchists, such as Leo Tolstoy and Ammon Hennacy, believe Paul distorted Jesus' teachings. Tolstoy claims Paul was instrumental in the church's "deviation" from Jesus' teaching and practices, while Hennacy believed "Paul spoiled the message of Christ."

Criticism of the "Pauline Christianity"-thesis
Christians themselves disagree as to how far there was tension between Paul and the Jerusalem Church. Roman Catholics, Eastern and Oriental Orthodox, Assyrian Church of the East, and conservative Protestants, contend that Paul's writings were a legitimate interpretation of the Gospel. The idea that Paul invented Christianity is disputed by numerous Christian writers.

According to Christopher Rowland, Pauline Christianity is the development of thinking about Jesus in a gentile missionary context. Rowland contends that "the extent of his influence on Christian thought has been overestimated", concluding that Paul did not materially alter Jesus' teachings.

Hurtado notes that Paul regarded his Christological views and the Jerusalem Church's as essentially similar. According to Hurtado, this "work[s] against the claims by some scholars that Pauline Christianity represents a sharp departure from the religiousness of Judean 'Jesus movements'."

As a pejorative term
The pejorative use of the expressions "Pauline Christianity", "Paulism," or "Paulanity," refers to the idea that Paul's supporters, as a distinct group, had an undue influence on the formation of the canon of scripture. It is also sometimes used to refer to the notion that certain bishops, especially the Bishop of Rome, influenced the debates which determined the dogma of early Christianity, thus elevating a Pauline interpretation of the Gospel, to the detriment of other interpretations (including those held by the Gnostics and Marcionites).

See also

 Antinomianism
 Authorship of the Pauline epistles
 Biblical canon
 Christian anarchism
 Development of the Christian biblical canon
 Hyperdispensationalism
 Jesuism
 New Perspective on Paul
 Pauline mysticism
 Pauline privilege
 Paul the Apostle and Judaism
 Proto-orthodox Christianity
 Law of Christ
 Paul and Gnosticism

Notes

References 
 Citations to web-sources

 Citations to printed sources

 Printed sources

 

 W. D. Davies, Paul and Rabbinic Judaism 2d ed., London, 1965

Further reading
Adams, Edward and Horrell, David G. Christianity at Corinth: The Quest for the Pauline Church 2004
Bockmuehl, Markus N. A. Revelation and Mystery in Ancient Judaism and Pauline Christianity
Brown, Raymond E. An Introduction to the New Testament 1997 
Brown, Raymond E. Does the NT call Jesus God? Theological Studies #26, 1965
 
Dunn, James D.G. The Theology of Paul the Apostle Eerdmans 1997 
Dunn, James D. G. The Apostle of the Heretics: Paul, Valentinus, and Marcion, in Porter, Stanley E.; Yoon, David, Paul and Gnosis BRILL 2016 
Ehrman, Bart D. Lost Christianities: The Battle for Scripture and the Faiths We Never Knew 2003
Elsner, Jas. Imperial Rome and Christian Triumph: Oxford History of Early Non-Pauline Christianity 1998 
Griffith-Jones, Robin. The Gospel According to Paul 2004.
Holland, Tom. Contours of Pauline Theology: A Radical New Survey on the Influences of Paul's Biblical Writings 2004 
Maccoby, Hyam. The Mythmaker: Paul and the Invention of Christianity  1986 
Kim, Yung Suk. Christ's Body in Corinth: The Politics of a Metaphor 2008 
Kim, Yung Suk. A Theological Introduction to Paul's Letters. 2011 
MacDonald, Dennis Ronald. The Legend and the Apostle : The Battle for Paul in Story and Canon Philadelphia: Westminster Press 1983
Mount, Christopher N. Pauline Christianity: Luke-Acts and the Legacy of Paul 2001
Pagels, Elaine The Gnostic Paul: Gnostic Exegesis of the Pauline Letters Fortress Press 1975 
Pietersen, Lloyd K. Polemic of the Pastorals: A Sociological Examination of the Development of Pauline Christianity 2004
Sanders, E. P. Jesus and Judaism 1987 
Sanders, E. P. Paul the Law and the Jewish People 1983
Sanders, E. P. Paul and Palestinian Judaism: A Comparison of Patterns of Religion 1977 
Theissen, Gerd. The Social Setting of Pauline Christianity: Essays on Corinth 2004
Westerholm, Stephen. Perspectives Old and New on Paul: The "Lutheran" Paul and His Critics 2003 
Wright, N. T. What Saint Paul Really Said: Was Paul of Tarsus the Real Founder of Christianity? 1997 
Wilson, A. N. Paul: The Mind of the Apostle 1997
Ziesler, John A. Pauline Christianity, Revised 1990

External links
New Perspective on Paul
The History of the Origins of Christianity. Saint Paul.

 
Catholic theology and doctrine
1st-century Christianity
Christian terminology
Christian theological movements
Hellenism and Christianity